Ovidiu Muşetescu (born Bucharest, September 15, 1955 - died there, October 18, 2009) was a Romanian politician.  He was a member of the Social Democratic Party and died of cancer.

References
Obituary (in Romanian)

1955 births
2009 deaths
Social Democratic Party (Romania) politicians
Deaths from cancer in Romania